The Fulton Chain Railroad, also known as the "Peg Leg", was a  narrow gauge private railroad connecting Moose River to Minnehaha, New York, in the Fulton Chain of Lakes. The line was built in 1888, and ceased running in 1892.  The line was eight miles (13 km) long, and had wooden rails, hence the nickname "Peg Leg".  It ran only during the summer months to carry vacationers to the Fulton Chain of Lakes.

References

 

Defunct New York (state) railroads
1892 disestablishments in New York (state)
3 ft gauge railways in the United States
Narrow gauge railroads in New York (state)
Railway companies established in 1888
Railway companies disestablished in 1892
1888 establishments in New York (state)